Attila Vári (born 26 February 1976 in Budapest), nicknamed Doki, is a Hungarian water polo player, who played on the gold medal squads at the 2000 Summer Olympics and 2004 Summer Olympics.

Vári began his athletic career with modern pentathlon but later switched to water polo. He made his debut for the Hungarian national team in 1997.

Attila's back hand shot from ten meters in the 2000 Olympic finals against Russia was probably the most unexpected and spectacular goal anyone ever scored in an Olympic final game in water polo.

Vári was elected into the presidium of the Hungarian Olympic Committee (MOB) in May 2017. He was elected President of the Hungarian Water Polo Federation (MVLSZ) in September 2018, replacing Dénes Kemény. The ruling party Fidesz–KDNP nominated Vári as their candidate for the position of Mayor of Pécs in the 2019 Hungarian local elections, but was defeated by the opposition's joint candidate Attila Péterffy.

Honours

National
 Olympic Games:  gold medal – 2000, 2004
 World Championships:  gold medal – 2003;  silver medal – 1998, 2005
 European Championship:  gold medal – 1997, 1999;  bronze medal – 2001, 2003
 FINA World League:  gold medal – 2003, 2004;  silver medal – 2005;  bronze medal – 2002
 FINA World Cup:  gold medal – 1999;  silver medal – 2002;  bronze medal – 1997
 Universiade: (silver medal – 1995)
 Junior World Championships: (gold medal – 1995)
 Junior European Championship: (gold medal – 1994)

Club
 Euroleague Winners (1): (2004 – with Bp. Honvéd)
 Cup Winners' Cup Winners (2): (1995, 2002 – with Vasas)
 LEN Super Cup Winner (1): (2004 – with Bp. Honvéd)

 Hungarian Championship (OB I): 4x (2003, 2004, 2005, 2006 – with Bp. Honvéd)
 Hungarian Cup (Magyar Kupa): 4x (1996 (1), 1997, 2001, 2002 – with Vasas)
 Hungarian SuperCup (Szuperkupa): 1x (2001 – with Vasas)

Awards
 Masterly youth athlete: 1995
 Member of the Hungarian team of year: 1997, 1999, 2000, 2003, 2004
 Hungarian Water Polo Player of the Year: 2000
 Csanádi-díj: 2001

Orders
   Officer's Cross of the Order of Merit of the Republic of Hungary (2000)
   Commander's Cross of the Order of Merit of the Republic of Hungary (2004)

See also
 Hungary men's Olympic water polo team records and statistics
 List of Olympic champions in men's water polo
 List of Olympic medalists in water polo (men)
 List of world champions in men's water polo
 List of World Aquatics Championships medalists in water polo

References

External links
 

1976 births
Living people
Water polo players from Budapest
Hungarian male water polo players
Water polo centre backs
Water polo players at the 2000 Summer Olympics
Water polo players at the 2004 Summer Olympics
Medalists at the 2000 Summer Olympics
Medalists at the 2004 Summer Olympics
Olympic gold medalists for Hungary in water polo
World Aquatics Championships medalists in water polo
Universiade medalists in water polo
Universiade silver medalists for Hungary
Medalists at the 1995 Summer Universiade